The 1999–2000 Wessex Football League was the 14th season of the Wessex Football League. The league champions for the third time in their history were Wimborne Town, who won the title on goal difference. There was no promotion to the Southern League, but East Cowes Victoria Athletic finished bottom and were relegated.

For sponsorship reasons, the league was known as the Jewson Wessex League.

League table
The league consisted of one division of 21 clubs, increased from 20 the previous season, after one new club joined:
Andover, rejoining after just one season in the Southern Football League, having resigned for financial reasons.

References

Wessex Football League seasons
9